Chaah Bahru is a mukim in Batu Pahat District, Johor, Malaysia.

See also
 Geography of Malaysia

References

Mukims of Batu Pahat District